Pandit Raghunath Murmu Smriti Mahavidyalaya, established in 1986, is the general degree college in Baragari PO Jambani, Bankura district. It offers undergraduate and Postgraduate courses in arts and sciences. It is affiliated to  Bankura University.

History
Pandit Raghunath Smriti Mahavidyalaya was established in 1986 by an order of the Govt. of West Bengal. The college is named after Pandit Raghunath Murmu who invented the ‘Alchiki Script’ for the Santali Language. This college is situated in extreamly rural area and provides higher education to the socially and economically backward students of this area,  a large number of whom belong the Schedule Casts and Schedule Tribes category. The college is famous for its quality education also.

Location

The college is located at Baragari village near Pirolgari More (also known as P More;  from Bankura Town) which is on the Bankura – Jhargram State Highway on the southwestern border of Bankura District.

Departments

Science

Computer Science ( General / Honours )
Mathematics ( General / Honours )
Physics ( General )
Chemistry ( General )
Forestry (4yrs course / Honours )
Faltu education

Arts

Bengali ( General / Honours ) 
English ( General / Honours )
Santali ( General / Honours )
Sanskrit ( General / Honours ) 
History ( General / Honours )
Geography ( General / Honours )
Political Science ( General / Honours )
Philosophy ( General / Honours )
Physical Education ( General )
Defence Studies ( General )

PG Dept.
Santali ( MA) 
Geography ( MA / Msc) 
Bengali ( MA) 
Geo-informatics ( Msc ) 
Bio-informatics ( Msc) 
Rural Development & Planning ( MA / Msc )

Affiliations & Accreditation
Pandit Raghunath Murmu Smriti Mahavidyalaya has been re-accredited and awarded B+ grade by the National Assessment and Accreditation Council (NAAC). The college is also recognized by the University Grants Commission (UGC).

Library

The college has a well-equipped and partially computerized library of 1826sqft area. It has more than 16,205 books. The library subscribes to major e-magazines and newspapers and tied with National Digital Library Of India.

See also

References

External links 
 http://www.prmsmahavidyalaya.org/

Colleges affiliated to Bankura University
Educational institutions established in 1986
Universities and colleges in Bankura district
1986 establishments in West Bengal